The Man in Room 17 is a British television series which ran for two series in the mid-1960s, produced by the northern weekday ITV franchise, Granada Television. Key to the series' success was the involvement of writer/producer Robin Chapman.

Overview
The show was set in Room 17 of the Department of Social Research, where former wartime agent-turned-criminologist Edwin Oldenshaw (Richard Vernon) solved difficult police cases through theory and discussions with his assistant (originally Ian Dimmock (Michael Aldridge), later succeeded by Imlac Defraits (Denholm Elliott), owing to Aldridge becoming ill). (The characters of Dimmock and Defraits may have been given the same initials to continue a play on words. Oldenshaw was sometimes identified as Edwin G. Oldenshaw. In the last episode, Oldenshaw and Defraits are in a park, feeding waterfowl, and the camera zooms in on their briefcases, bearing their initials: E.G.O. and I.D.).

The novelty of the series was that Oldenshaw and his colleagues never needed to leave their office in order to resolve cases, preferring to spend their time playing the board game of Go. They simply provided their prognosis and left the police to do the cleaning up. Different directors were often appointed to film the Room 17 and outside-world scenes independently, to maintain a sense of distance between the two worlds.

The rarefied nature of Oldenshaw's work was amplified in 1967 when he returned, re-united with Dimmock, in a new series, The Fellows (Late of Room 17). This series saw the pair relocated to All Saints College, Cambridge University, where they were appointed to the Peel Research Fellowship. Their research was (as it is stated in the series) "to investigate the general proposition that, in a period of rapid social change, the nature of crime (and therefore criminals) would change". Their research led them into encounters (though never physical) with gangland boss Alec Spindoe (Ray McAnally), who eventually ended up behind bars thanks, unknown to Spindoe, to psychological pressure from Oldenshaw. The Spindoe character was to return in his own series, Spindoe in 1968, which charted his attempts to regain his criminal empire after release from prison.

An episode of The Man in Room 17 - the series 2 opener 'How to Rob Bank - And Get Away with it' was released on DVD in 2007 as a bonus feature for the complete series box set of Randall and Hopkirk (Deceased). The episode featured a guest role for R&H(D) star Mike Pratt. A solitary episode of The Fellows was released on DVD in 2007 as part of a set from Network DVD dedicated to the work of Robin Chapman and featuring Spindoe and his later gangster series Big Breadwinner Hog.

The first series of The Man in Room 17 was released on DVD in the United Kingdom on 17 June 2013. The second series was released on 3 March 2014. The Fellows (late of Room 17) was released on 1 July 2013.

Recurring cast

The Man in Room 17
Edwin Oldenshaw        —   Richard Vernon
Ian Dimmock            —   Michael Aldridge, series 1
Imlac Defraits         —   Denholm Elliott, series 2
Sir Geoffrey Norton    —   Willoughby Goddard
Tracey Peverill        —   Amber Kammer, series 2
Hatton                 —   Michael Gover, series 2

The Fellows (Late of Room 17)
Edwin Oldenshaw        —   Richard Vernon
Ian Dimmock            —   Michael Aldridge
Mrs Hollinczech        —   Jill Booty
Thomas Anthem          —   James Ottaway
Nashe                  —   Michael Turner
Det. Sgt Phillips       —   Clifford Cocks
Alec Spindoe           —   Ray McAnally
Fletcher               —   Ray Lonnen
Astley                 —   Allan Cuthbertson
Gerry                  —   Edward Atienza
Sherratt               —   Roy Marsden

Episodes

The Man in Room 17

Series 1
11 Jun 65   —   Tell the Truth
18 Jun 65   —   Hello, Lazarus
25 Jun 65   —   The Years Of Glory
2 Jul 65    —   Confidential Report
9 Jul 65    —   The Millions Of Mazafariyah
16 Jul 65   —   The Seat Of Power
23 Jul 65   —   Safe Conduct
30 Jul 65   —   A Minor Operation
6 Aug 65    —   Find the Lady
13 Aug 65   —   The Bequest
20 Aug 65   —   Up Against a Brick Wall
27 Aug 65   —   Out for a Duck
3 Sep 65    —   Black Anniversary

Series 2

8 Apr 66    —   How to Rob a Bank - and Get Away with It
15 Apr 66   —   Vendetta
22 Apr 66   —   The Black Witch
29 Apr 66   —   First Steal Six Eggs
6 May 66    —   The Catacombs
13 May 66   —   Where There's Will
20 May 66   —   The Fissile Missile Makers
27 May 66   —   The Goddess of Love
3 Jun 66    —   Undue Influence
10 Jun 66   —   Lady Luck's No Gentleman
17 Jun 66   —   The Standard
24 Jun 66   —   Saints Are Safer Dead
1 Jul 66    —   Never Fall Down

The Fellows (Late of Room 17)
15 May 67   —   Episode 1
22 May 67   —   Episode 2
30 May 67   —   Episode 3
5 Jun 67    —   Episode 4
12 Jun 67   —   Episode 5
19 Jun 67   —   Episode 6
26 Jun 67   —   Episode 7
7 Jul 67    —   Episode 8
14 Jul 67   —   Episode 9
21 Jul 67   —   Episode 10
28 Jul 67   —   Episode 11
4 Aug 67    —   Episode 12
11 Aug 67   —   Episode 13

External links 
 

1960s British drama television series
ITV television dramas
Television shows produced by Granada Television
English-language television shows
Detective television series